iVeri is a payments technology company that facilitates transaction acceptance for banks and businesses. The company is based in Johannesburg, South Africa. Established in 1998, it is South Africa's largest technology provider for physical and mobile commerce.

iVeri is PCI DSS compliant, (a payment card industry security requirement for entities that process, transmit and/or store cardholder data) and EMV approved. All products meet both industry and association best practice standards.

History 

iVeri was launched as a company, and began developing electronic payment technology in 1998.
Originally operating in South Africa and Namibia they developed payment technologies, one of South Africa's largest banks. They were one of the first companies to offer E-commerce transactions in South Africa and one of the first mobile point of sale (Mpos) devices in Africa.
Since 2006 they have branched out into the rest of Africa and now provide a variety of payment functions in many African countries.

iVeri provides card acceptance utility in developing economies. Their mobile commerce system allowed remote merchants such as game lodges and tourist trains to process transactions in places with minimal infrastructure.

Since 2010 the company has been recognised for its advanced technological innovation in its products and humanitarian work using technology by receiving a number of international awards.

In June 2016, iVeri launched the first annual African Financial Retail Readiness Index (AFRRI) report, looking at the maturity of the current financial services sector across eight African countries. The AFRRI report looks at Kenya, Nigeria, Ghana, South Africa, Tanzania, Uganda, Zambia, and Zimbabwe comparing social, economic, and demographic information to assess the maturity and potential for formal retail banking in each country.

Core products

Payment Gateway 
iVeri Payment Gateway provides mobile, internet, recurring payment, point of sale and card-not-present card acceptance channels, including reporting and back-office functionality for both the bank and the merchants.

iVeri and WWF 
iVeri created the technology, maintains and sponsors the FishMS service for WWF SASSI. Since SASSI's (South African Sustainable Seafood Initiative) FishMS service first went live in December 2006 it has responded to over a substantial number of queries on sustainable seafood from over 18,000 different consumers around South Africa.

References

Financial technology companies
Information technology companies of South Africa
Companies based in Johannesburg